"Who Are the Brain Police?" is a Frank Zappa song, performed by The Mothers of Invention, released on the Mothers' debut album, Freak Out!.  It was released by Verve Records as a single in 1966. Zappa stated that the song was one of religious theme.

Zappa wrote about the song on the Freak Out! liner notes:  "At five o’clock in the morning someone kept singing this in my mind and made me write it down. I will admit to being frightened when I finally played it out loud and sang the words."

In a 1988 interview, Zappa added:

Song structure
The song's structure was described in detail by AllMusic:

Critical reception
The song was stated to be a "direct defiance of top 40 radio". Repetitive lyrics were noted as part of this "defiance". The song was also cited by Mojo magazine as "one of the scariest songs to ever emerge from the rock psyche". While comparing it to Kafka, Mojo described the song as "a vision of contemporary America where personal identity and individuality is erased".

Personnel
Frank Zappa – guitar, vocals
Ray Collins – vocals
Jimmy Carl Black – drums
Roy Estrada – bass guitar
Elliot Ingber –  guitar

with:

Eugene Di Novi – piano
Gene Estes – percussion
Neil Le Vang – guitar

Covers
 Camper Van Beethoven – 2000 rarities compilation, Camper Van Beethoven Is Dead. Long Live Camper Van Beethoven.
 Mark Nauseef – Snake Music 
 Monks of Doom – The Insect God. EP
 The Molecules – Bootleg or Rootleg
 The Ed Palermo Big Band – tribute album, The Ed Palermo Big Band Plays the Music of Frank Zappa
 Jon Poole – What's The Ugliest Part Of Your Body?

References

Frank Zappa songs
1966 songs
Songs written by Frank Zappa
Song recordings produced by Tom Wilson (record producer)
1966 singles
Verve Records singles
Songs critical of religion
Political songs